Aleksandr Nikolayevich Radchenko (born 14 September 1993) is a Russian professional football player.

Club career
He made his Russian Football National League debut for FC SKA-Energiya Khabarovsk on 25 September 2011 in a game against FC Sibir Novosibirsk.

Personal life
He is the older brother of Nikolai Radchenko.

External links

References

1993 births
People from Khabarovsky District
Sportspeople from Khabarovsk Krai
Living people
Russian people of Ukrainian descent
Russian footballers
Russia youth international footballers
Association football forwards
FC SKA-Khabarovsk players
FC Tosno players
FC Sokol Saratov players
FC Yenisey Krasnoyarsk players
FC Volgar Astrakhan players
FC Khimki players
FC Tekstilshchik Ivanovo players
FC Urartu players
FC Dynamo Bryansk players
Russian First League players
Russian Second League players
Armenian Premier League players
Russian expatriate footballers
Expatriate footballers in Armenia
Russian expatriate sportspeople in Armenia